Govindbhai Patel was Gujarati filmmaker known for his superhits Dhola Maru and Desh Re Joya Dada Pardesh Joya.

Life
Govindbhai Patel was born on 11 January 1943. He hailed from Keshod, Gujarat. He administered cinema hall before entering in filmmaking. Around 1980, he started producing Gujarati films under GN Films banner. Dhola Maru (1983) was his first superhit film. He later produced several successful films including Jode Rehjo Raj, Saibo Sava Lakhno, Sejal Sarju, Hiran Ne Kanthe, Patan thi Pakistan, Taro Malak Mare Jovo Chhe, Gamma Piyariyu ne Gamma Sasariyu, Dholi Taro Dhol Vage (2005). His Desh Re Joya Dada Pardesh Joya (1998) was commercially superhit and earned more than  10 crore.

He died on 15 April 2015 at Vadodara. He was cremated at Khaswadi crematorium.

Personal life
Goavindbhai Patel was married to Chandrikaben and had three sons and a daughter.

Filmography
 Dhola Maru
 Hiran Ne Kanthe
 Sajan Tara Sambharna
 Moti Verana Chokma
 Jode Rahejo Raj
 Ladi Lakhani Saybo Sawa Lakhno
 Laju Lakhan
 Tahuke Sajan Sambhare
 Raj Rajwan
 Hu Tari Mira Ne Tu Maro Shyam
 Tara Rudiya Ni Rani Bol Bandhani
 Unchi Medi Na Uncha Mol
 Desh Re Joya Dada Pardesh Joya (1998)
 Sejal Sarju
 Amdavad Palanpur Vaya Kadi Kalol
 Gamma Piyariyu Gamma Sasariyu
 Taro Malak Mare Jovo Che
 Maihar No Mandavo Preetno Panetar
 Moghera Mulni Chundadi Ho Sahiba
 Dholi Taro Dhol Vaage (2005)
 Patan thi Pakistan

References

External links
 

1943 births
2015 deaths
Gujarati-language film directors
Film directors from Gujarat
Indian male screenwriters
Film producers from Gujarat
People from Vadodara
20th-century Indian film directors